"Love Never Dies (Back for the First Time)" is a song performed by British dubstep producer Caspa and singer-songwriter Mr Hudson. It was released on 16 August 2010 as a digital download in the United Kingdom. It peaked to number 42 on the UK Singles Chart. The song also features and was co-produced by D1, who was only credited in the original instrumental track.

Music video
A music video to accompany the release of "Love Never Dies (Back For The First Time)" was first released onto YouTube on 12 August 2010 at a total length of three minutes and thirty-three seconds.

Track listing

Chart performance

Release history

References

2010 singles
Mr Hudson songs
Dubstep songs
2010 songs
Songs written by Mr Hudson